Chandankiyari Assembly constituency   is an assembly constituency in the Indian state of Jharkhand. It is reserved for scheduled castes.

Overview
Chandankiyari (Vidhan Sabha constituency covers: Chandankiyari police station and Bijulia, Alkusa, Buribinor, Khamarbendi, Dudhigajar, Kura Dabartupara, Jaitara, Pundru and Sardaha gram panchayats in Chas police station in Chas sub-division of Bokaro district.

Chandankiyari is part of Dhanbad (Lok Sabha constituency).

Election results
Amar Kumar Bauri of BJP is current MLA of Chandankiyari who also holds seat in ministry.  Umakant Rajak of AJSU won in the 37 Chandankiyari  (SC) assembly constituency in 2009 defeating Amar Kumar Bauri of Jharkhand Vikas Morcha (Prajatantrik). Haru Rajwar of JMM defeated Umakant Rajak of AJSU in 2005 and Satish Chandra Rajak, Independent, in 2000. Gaur Harijan, Independent, defeated Haru Rajwar, Independent, in 1995. Gaur Harijan representing BJP defeated Haru Rajwar representing JMM in 1990. Lata Devi (Mali) of Congress defeated Padamlochan Rajwar of BJP in 1983. Haru Rajwar, Independent, defeated Satika Dhoba of Congress in 1980. Ram Das Ram of Congress defeated Durga Charan Das of Janata Party in 1977.

Members of Assembly 
2000:Haru Rajwar, Jharkhand Mukti Morcha
2005: Haru Rajwar, Jharkhand Mukti Morcha
2009: Umakant Rajak, All Jharkhand Students Union
2014: Amar Kumar Bauri, Jharkhand Vikas Morcha (Prajatantrik)
2019: Amar Kumar Bauri, Bharatiya Janata Party

See also
Vidhan Sabha
List of states of India by type of legislature

References
Schedule – XIII of Constituencies Order, 2008 of Delimitation of Parliamentary and Assembly constituencies Order, 2008 of the Election Commission of India 
http://www.thehindu.com/news/national/other-states/six-jvmp-mlas-join-bjp/article6882145.ece

Assembly constituencies of Jharkhand